Korathota Grama Niladhari Division is a Grama Niladhari Division of the Kaduwela Divisional Secretariat  of Colombo District  of Western Province, Sri Lanka .  It has Grama Niladhari Division Code 488.

Korathota is a surrounded by the Welihinda, Mullegama North, Dedigamuwa, Pahala Bomiriya B, Nawagamuwa, Nawagamuwa South, Shanthalokagama, Thunadahena and Kothalawala  Grama Niladhari Divisions.

Demographics

Ethnicity 

The Korathota Grama Niladhari Division has a Sinhalese majority (98.3%) . In comparison, the Kaduwela Divisional Secretariat (which contains the Korathota Grama Niladhari Division) has a Sinhalese majority (95.6%)

Religion 

The Korathota Grama Niladhari Division has a Buddhist majority (96.3%) . In comparison, the Kaduwela Divisional Secretariat (which contains the Korathota Grama Niladhari Division) has a Buddhist majority (90.4%)

Grama Niladhari Divisions of Kaduwela Divisional Secretariat

References